Skuld was a princess of Scandinavian legend who married Heoroweard and encouraged him to kill Hroðulf (Hrólfr Kraki) in Hrólfs saga kraka. The accounts of her vary greatly from source to source. Skuld is derived from the Old Norse verb skulla, "need/ought to be/shall be"; its meaning is "that which should become, or that needs to occur". Other similarly named characters appear in the Skjöldunga saga and the Gesta Danorum, as well as the Chronicon Lethrense.

Hrólfs saga kraka 
Hrólfs saga kraka tells that one Yule, Helgi (appears as Halga in Beowulf) was visited by an ugly being while he was in his hunting house. No person in the entire kingdom allowed the being to enter the house, except Helgi. Later, the thing asked to sleep in his bed. Unwillingly he agreed, and as the thing got into the bed, it turned into a dark elvish woman, who was clad in silk and who was the most beautiful woman he had ever seen. He raped her, and made her pregnant. Helgi forgot the woman and a couple of days after the date had passed, he was visited by the woman, who had Skuld on her arms. The daughter would marry Hjörvarđr (Heoroweard).
Much later, when her half-brother Hrólfr Kraki was King of the Danes, Skuld began to turn her husband against Hrólfr. Under the pretext that they would wait three years before paying the accumulated tribute at one time, Skuld assembled a large army which included strong warriors, criminals, elves and norns. She was a great sorceress and used seiðr (witchcraft) to hide the great muster from Hrólfr and his champions. They then arrived at Lejre one Yule for the midwinter blóts, with all the weapons hidden in wagons to ambush the king at night. A battle ensued and, in the account found in Gesta Danorum, Bödvar Bjarki fought in the shape of a spirit bear until he was awakened by Hjalti. To overcome him, Skuld cast the most powerful spell to resuscitate her fallen warriors and after a long fight Hrólfr and all his eleven champions fell, with the sole exception of Vöggr who promises to avenge the king.
As Hjörvarđr was also killed in the battle, Skuld became the Queen of Denmark but did not rule well and only for a short time. Bödvar Bjarki's brothers Elk-Froði and Thorir (Þorir) Houndsfoot went to Denmark to avenge their brother. The Swedish queen Yrsa gave them a large Swedish army headed by Vöggr. They seized the wicked elf queen by surprise, just as she had suddenly attacked the king, tying her arms so she could not use her magic arts. With no spells to prevent it, they then slew all of her supernatural rabble. After this, a vengeance was exacted on Skuld in retribution for her treachery and fratricide, as she was tortured to death through a variety of the most dreadful ways. The rule over the kingdom was then restored to King Hrólfr's daughters. When all this was accomplished, everyone went home.

Skjöldunga saga

The Skjöldunga saga relates that Helgo (Halga) was the King of Denmark together with his brother Roas (Hroðgar). Helgo raped Olava, the Queen of the Saxons, and she bore a daughter named Yrsa. The girl later married King Adillus (Eadgils), the King of Sweden. Yrsa and Adillus had a daughter, Scullda. Yrsa and Adillus married their Scullda to Hiørvardus, the King of Öland (also called Hiorvardus and Hevardus, and who corresponds to Heoroweard in Beowulf). As her half-brother Rolfo (Hrólfr Kraki, Hroðulf) was not consulted about this marriage, he was infuriated and he attacked Öland and made Hiørvardus and his kingdom tributary to Denmark. Hiørvardus and Queen Skullda rebelled against Rolfo and killed him. However, Hiørvardus did not live long after this and was himself killed.

Gesta Danorum

The Gesta Danorum tells that Roluo (Hrólfr Kraki) defeated Athislus (Eadgils) and gave Sweden to a young man named Hiartuar (Heoroweard), who was seized by passion to Roluo's beautiful but heartless sister Skulde and married her. The ambitious Skulde, however, did not like the fact that her husband had to pay taxes to Roluo and so incited Hiartuar to rebel against him. Hiartuar went to Lejre (a town which Roluo had built) with arms hidden in the ships, under the pretense that he wanted to pay tribute. They were well-received, but after the banquet, when most people were drunk asleep, the Swedes and the Goths (i.e. the Geats) proceeded to kill everyone at Roluo's residence. After a long battle, involving Roluo's champion Bjarki, who fought in the shape of a spirit bear until he was awakened by his comrade Hjalti, the Geats won and Roluo was killed. Hiartuar asked Wigg (Vöggr) if he wanted to fight for him, and Wigg said yes. Hiartuar wanted to give Wigg a sword, but he insisted on receiving it by taking the hilt. Having the hilt in his hand, Wigg pierced Hiartuar with the sword and thus avenged Roluo. Swedes and Geats then rushed forward and killed Wigg. The Swedish king Høtherus (based on the god Höðr), the brother of Athislus, succeeded Roluo and became the king of a combined Sweden and Denmark.

Chronicon Lethrense and Annales Lundenses
The Chronicon Lethrense (and the included Annales Lundenses) tell that Rolf Krage's sister Skulda was married against Rolf's will to Hartwar/Hiarwarth (Heoroweard), a German earl of Skåne, but reputedly Rolf had given Skulda to him together with Sweden. Hjartwar arrived in Zealand with a large army and said that he wanted to give his tribute to Rolf, but killed the sleeping Rolf together with all his berserkers after these intoxicated themselves at a banquet Rolf had given in honor of his sister's arrival. Only one survived, Wigge (Vöggr), who played along until he was to do homage to Hjartwar. Then, he pierced Hartwar with a sword, and so Hjartwar was only king one morning. However, according to a reputation, it was instead an Åke who killed Hjartwar with seven dagger-stabs and so became king.

See also
Skuld

References

Elves
Legendary Norsemen
Mythological princesses
Mythological queens
Witches in folklore